The WCT Uiseong International Curling Cup is an annual bonspiel, or curling tournament, held at the Uiseong Curling Club in Uiseong-eup, Uiseong County, South Korea. It has been a part of the Men's and Women's World Curling Tour since 2019. The tournament is held in a round robin format.

Past champions

Men

Women

References

World Curling Tour events
Curling competitions in South Korea
Uiseong County
Women's World Curling Tour events